Robin Lesley Denton (née Glenie; born ) is a New Zealand badminton player. She competed at three Commonwealth Games between 1970 and 1982, and won the bronze medal in the mixed doubles with Steve Wilson at the 1982 Commonwealth Games.

Early life and family
Denton was born Robin Lesley Glenie in 1950 or 1951, one of five children of Gwen Gibson Glenie (née Gardner) and Jack Patrick Glenie. Her siblings include Alison Glenie, who was also a New Zealand badminton representative. She was educated at St Cuthbert's College, Auckland.

She became a schoolteacher and married international badminton umpire Robert Denton, also a teacher.

Badminton
Denton represented New Zealand in badminton at three Commonwealth Games: in 1970, 1974 and 1982.

At the 1970 British Commonwealth Games in Edinburgh, competing as Robin Glenie, she lost her respective opening matches in the women's singles and women's doubles (with her sister Alison Glenie). In the mixed doubles, with John Compton, she won her first match before being eliminated in the round of 16.

In 1974, competing under her married name at the British Commonwealth Games in Christchurch, she was again defeated in the first round of the women's singles. In the women's doubles, partnering her sister Alison, she won her first round match before being eliminated in the quarter-finals by the Malaysian pair of Rosalind Singha Ang and Sylvia Ng. In the mixed doubles she and partner Bryan Purser won their first-round match, before losing in the round of 16.

At her final Commonwealth Games, in 1982 at Brisbane, Denton lost in the first round of the women's singles. With Toni Whittaker she reached the quarter-finals of the women's doubles, and she won the bronze medal with Steve Wilson in the mixed doubles. In the mixed teams event, Denton was a part of the New Zealand team that finished fourth, losing to Malaysia in the play-off for the bronze medal.

References

1950s births
Living people
Badminton players at the 1970 British Commonwealth Games
Badminton players at the 1974 British Commonwealth Games
Badminton players at the 1982 Commonwealth Games
Commonwealth Games bronze medallists for New Zealand
New Zealand female badminton players
Commonwealth Games medallists in badminton
20th-century New Zealand women
21st-century New Zealand women
Medallists at the 1982 Commonwealth Games